The ZIL-157 is a general-purpose -ton 6×6 truck, produced at the Lichachev plant in the Soviet Union from 1958 to 1977, when production was transferred to the Amur plant, since the Lichachev plant wanted to focus more on modern trucks, such as the ZIL-131 truck. Nevertheless, production of the ZIL-157 trucks continued even after the fall of the Soviet Union, but eventually ended in 1994.

History 
The ZIL-157 started being produced in 1958, based on the ZIL-164 truck, as a replacement for the ZIS-151 that was based on the ZIS-150 truck, which was based on the International KR-11 trucks.

The ZIL-157 truck, like its many predecessors, was mostly intended for use by the Red Army, but it was also popular with forestry companies, and was thus also used as a log truck, specifically the ZIL-157V semi-truck version. In 1977 the production of the truck was moved to Novouralsk by the UamZ company. The Lichachev plant likely did that move since, they wanted to focus their main production efforts, on more modern trucks on the same class, such as the ZIL-131 truck.

The UamZ company continued producing the truck even after the fall of the Soviet Union until 1994.

Around 797,934 trucks were produced by the Lichachev plant and a further 160,000 in the UamZ plant. The truck was also produced in China as the Jiefang CA30 until 1986.

Variants
 ZIL-157 (ЗИЛ-157) - cargo truck, produced 1958 - 1961
 ZIL-157E - As ZIL-157, but with no cargo platform, two fuel tanks, and no spare wheel bracket.
 ZIL-157G - As ZIL-157, but with shielded electrical equipment.
 ZIL-157K (ЗИЛ-157К) - cargo truck, produced 1962 - 1978. Modernized version of ZIL-157.
 ZIL-157KV (ЗИЛ-157КВ) - tractor unit, produced 1962 - 1978. Modernized version of ZIL-157V.
 ZIL-157KD (ЗИЛ-157КД) - 5-ton cargo truck, produced since 1978. Modernized version of ZIL-157K.
 ZIL-157KDV (ЗИЛ-157КДВ) - tractor unit, produced since 1978. Modernized version of ZIL-157KV.
 ZIL-157L - Prototype power-steering version of ZIL-157. Produced in 1958, cancelled due to front suspension and steering malfunctions.
 ZIL-157V - Tractor-trailer version. Produced 1958 - 1961.
 ZIL-165 - Prototype for ZIL-131. Produced in 1958.
 KMM (колёсный механизированный мост КММ) - Soviet military bridgelayer on ZIL-157 chassis

Operators

 
  - licensed-produced as Jiefang CA-30
  - Jiefang CA-30 variants from China
  - Indonesia got some Zil 157 stored in Dirgantara Mandala Museum,possibly bought in 1961

See also

Katyusha rocket launcher

References

External links
Fan-Club ZIL-157
English website for Russian Military Trucks
Short movie about the ZIL-157, with Russian comment
Russian drawings of ZIL-157

ZiL vehicles
Military trucks of the Soviet Union
Military vehicles introduced in the 1950s